The First Congregational Church of Woodstock, Vermont is an active Congregational church in Woodstock, Vermont.  The original building was constructed in 1807.  It acquired a bell produced by Paul Revere.  The building was rebuilt in 1890.

It is the historic church of Marsh-Billings-Rockefeller, and a historical account of the church was published in 1947.

See also
Marsh-Billings-Rockefeller National Historical Park

References

Further reading
The First Congregational Church of Woodstock, Vermont. An Historical Sketch Delivered before the Woodstock Historical Society, January 19, 1947, by Margaret L. Johnson.

External links

Congregational churches in Vermont
Churches in Windsor County, Vermont
Religious organizations established in 1809
Churches completed in 1890
1809 establishments in the United States
Buildings and structures in Woodstock, Vermont